The 1998–99 Czech 1.liga season was the sixth season of the Czech 1.liga, the second level of ice hockey in the Czech Republic. 14 teams participated in the league, and HC Znojemsti Orli won the championship.

Regular season

Relegation

External links
 Season on hockeyarchives.info

2
Czech
Czech 1. Liga seasons